Philosophy is the study of general and fundamental problems concerning matters such as existence and knowledge.

Philosophy may also refer to:

 Philosophical theory, a larger body of systematic philosophical theory
 Philosophy (brand), a North American cosmetics and skin care company
 Philosophy (journal), a journal published by the Cambridge University Press
 Philosophy (Salvator Rosa), a 1640 painting by Salvator Rosa
 Philosophy (album), an album by Coldcut
 Philosophy: The Best of Bill Hicks, an album by Bill Hicks
 "Philosophy" (Ben Folds Five song)
 "Philosophy", a song by Tom Snare

See also
 Wikipedia:Getting to Philosophy
 Philosophy of life, an attitude to life or way or principle of living